The Enchanted Type-Writer is a collection of short stories by John Kendrick Bangs, published in 1899 with illustrations by Peter Newell. Bangs attributes many of the stories to the late (and invisible) James Boswell, who has become an editor for a newspaper in Hades, and who communicates with the author by means of an old typewriter. The stories are part of the author's Associated Shades series, sometimes called the Hades series for its primary setting. Their genre has become known as Bangsian fantasy. 

There are ten stories in the collection, and ten plates from illustrations by Newell.
They were first published serially in Harper's Weekly beginning August 5, 1899, including the Newell illustrations.

References

External links

The Enchanted Type-Writer,  digital copy of the first edition, at the Internet Archive
 

1899 short story collections
Bangsian fantasy
Fantasy short story collections
Harper & Brothers books
Novels about the afterlife